Johri Farm is a new settlement in Jamia Nagar, New Delhi, India, in the district of South East Delhi. It's a very beautiful and peaceful area. The nearest Metro Station is Jamia Millia Islamia.

References

New Delhi